Treaty of the Reestablishment of the Latvia–Lithuania border was signed on 29 June 1993 between Lithuania and Latvia. The Latvia–Lithuania border was reestablished based on the Treaty of Latvia–Lithuania border of 1921, which was valid until 15 June 1940, i.e. the date of Soviet occupation.

References 

Treaties of Lithuania
Treaties of Latvia
Treaties concluded in 1993
Treaties entered into force in 1993
Latvia–Lithuania relations